Osteobrama bhimensis is a species of ray-finned fish in the genus Osteobrama. Osteobrama bhimensis is a synonym of Osteobrama vigorsii according to Fishbase.

Footnotes 
 

Bhimensis
Fish described in 1992